Ectophasia is a genus of flies in the family Tachinidae.

Species

E. atripennis (Townsend, 1927)
E. crassipennis (Fabricius, 1794)
E. leucoptera (Rondani, 1865)
E. oblonga (Robineau-Desvoidy, 1830)
E. platymesa (Walker, 1858)
E. rotundiventris (Loew, 1858)
E. sinensis Villeneuve, 1933

References

Phasiinae
Tachinidae genera
Articles containing video clips
Taxa named by Charles Henry Tyler Townsend